James Cotterell (7 February 1880 – 4 November 1944) was a British gymnast. He competed at the 1908 Summer Olympics and the 1920 Summer Olympics.

References

External links
 

1880 births
1944 deaths
British male artistic gymnasts
Olympic gymnasts of Great Britain
Gymnasts at the 1908 Summer Olympics
Gymnasts at the 1920 Summer Olympics
Place of birth missing